Franklin is a city in Warren County, Ohio, United States. The population was 11,690 at the 2020 census.

The Great Miami River flows through Franklin.  Ohio State Routes 73, 123 and 741 pass through Franklin, while Interstate 75 passes on the east side of the city.

History

Franklin was founded by General William C. Schenck, in 1796. The settlement was named for Benjamin Franklin. Franklin was incorporated in 1814, and became a city in 1951.

One of the first four post offices in Warren County was established in Franklin in 1805.  The first postmaster was John N.C. Schenck, brother of General Schenck.  The Franklin Post Office still stands (in a different location), and is one of four sites in Franklin listed on the National Register of Historic Places, along with the Mackinaw Historic District.

Construction of the Miami and Erie Canal occurred between 1825 and 1845. The canal followed the Great Miami River through Franklin, and the boat traffic led to new commerce. The town soon had a pork slaughterhouse, barrel making factory, sawmill, and whiskey distillery.

Franklin's first mayor, Dr. Absalom Death, was elected at a tavern meeting in 1837. Dr. Death went on to be director of a medical college in Cincinnati. In its history, two doctors in Franklin have been named "Dr. Death".

By the 1850s, the Franklin area was noted for breeding racehorses. One chestnut-colored mare, Nightingale, sired by Mambrino and Wood's Hambletonian, set a 3-mile harness racing record of 6:55½ in 1893.

A railroad was completed with a depot in Franklin in 1872. The town continued to prosper, and by 1890, five paper mills were located in Franklin. The town's economy suffered a setback in 1896, when Franklin's only bank crashed. A longtime and trusted teller had embezzled vast amounts of money, affecting the fortunes of many individuals and businesses.

The town marshal of Franklin, George Basore, was shot and killed in 1906 while attempting to arrest an African-American man, George White. When White was arrested, a crowd of 300 gathered outside the Franklin jail intent on lynching him. The sheriff and two deputies were able to remove White and take him to nearby Lebanon for his safety. The New York Times reported: "The whole town of Franklin is wrought up over the affair. Colored people were chased out without being given time to explain". White died the following year in the electric chair.

In 1907, Franklin's fire chief, B.H. Miller, walked into the police station and shot dead one of the prisoners who had allegedly had an affair with his wife a month earlier.

The town was devastated by the Great Flood of March 1913, when the Great Miami River overflowed its banks.

Franklin opened what was considered the world's first garbage-recycling plant in 1971.  Designed and built by the Black Clawson Company, the plant recycled metals from solid waste, and used recovered paper fibers to make roofing materials.

In 1989, Ronald Peters, a café owner in Franklin, was alleged to be the principal bookmaker for baseball player Pete Rose.

In 2015, The Museum of Spiritual Art opened.

In 2017, Franklin attracted national attention in the week following the Unite the Right rally in Charlottesville, Virginia when the city removed an obscure Confederate marker honoring Robert E. Lee that had existed along the right-of-way of Dixie Highway.  The marker had been dedicated in 1927 by the United Daughters of the Confederacy in what was at that time a part of Franklin Township.

Geography

Demographics

2010 census
As of the census of 2010, there were 11,771 people, 4,667 households, and 3,162 families residing in the city. The racial makeup of the city was 96.2% White, 0.9% African American, 0.2% Native American, 0.5% Asian, 0.4% from other races, and 1.7% from two or more races. Hispanic or Latino of any race were 1.6% of the population.

There were 4,667 households, of which 35.9% had children under the age of 18 living with them, 45.9% were married couples living together, 15.7% had a female householder with no husband present, 6.2% had a male householder with no wife present, and 32.2% were non-families. 26.8% of all households were made up of individuals, and 9.8% had someone living alone who was 65 years of age or older. The average household size was 2.49 and the average family size was 3.00.

The median age in the city was 36.7 years. 25.5% of residents were under the age of 18; 8.6% were between the ages of 18 and 24; 27.2% were from 25 to 44; 26.3% were from 45 to 64; and 12.5% were 65 years of age or older. The gender makeup of the city was 48.2% male and 51.8% female.

2000 census
As of the census of 2000, there were 11,396 people, 4,553 households, and 3,155 families residing in the city. The population density was 1,251.0 people per square mile (483.0/km2). There were 4,802 housing units at an average density of 527.1 per square mile (203.5/km2). The racial makeup of the city was 97.51% White, 0.82% African American, 0.12% Native American, 0.40% Asian, 0.32% from other races and 0.82% from two or more races. Hispanic or Latino of any race were 0.71% of the population.

There are 4,553 households, out of which 33.9% had children under the age of 18 living with them, 51.0% were married couples living together, 13.9% had a female householder with no husband present, and 30.7% were non-families. 26.3% of all households were made up of individuals, and 9.9% had someone living alone who was 65 years of age or older.  The average household size was 2.48 and the average family size was 2.99.

In the city the population was spread out, with 26.6% under the age of 18, 9.1% from 18 to 24, 31.7% from 25 to 44, 20.8% from 45 to 64, and 11.7% who were 65 years of age or older.  The median age was 34 years.  For every 100 females, there were 90.4 males.  For every 100 females age 18 and over, there were 87.2 males.

The median income for a household in the city was $38,142, and the median income for a family was $45,152. Males had a median income of $35,401 versus $24,752 for females. The per capita income for the city was $17,910.  About 8.2% of families and 10.1% of the population were below the poverty line, including 12.3% of those under age 18 and 8.4% of those age 65 or over.

Education
Schools of the Franklin City School District located in Franklin:
 Anthony Wayne Elementary School (named for Anthony Wayne, an officer in the Revolutionary War).
 Hunter Elementary
 Schenck Elementary (named after General William Schenck, founder of Franklin)
 Pennyroyal Elementary
Gerke Elementary
 Franklin Junior High School.
 Franklin High School.
Also served by nearby Bishop Fenwick High School, a local Catholic highschool under the  Archdiocese of Cincinnati.

Franklin has the Franklin Public Library, a branch of the Franklin-Springboro Public Library.

Notable people
 Samuel Bigger, seventh Governor of Indiana.
 Lewis D. Campbell,  U.S. Representative for Ohio.
 Mary Kennedy Carter, teacher and civil rights activist.
 Will Earhart, music educator. 
 Bergen Evans, lexicographer, Rhodes Scholar, professor, and television host. 
 Edwin F. Harding, commander of U.S. National Guard 32nd Infantry Division.
 Justin Woodward Harding, judge on the tribunal presiding over the Judges' Trial.
 Darrell Hedric, college basketball coach.
 Gene Huff, member of Kentucky House of Representatives and Senate.
 Luke Kennard, Duke Blue Devils men's basketball player, 12th overall pick by the Detroit Pistons in the 2017 NBA Draft
 Travis Lakins, former pitcher for Ohio State Buckeyes baseball, current pitcher for the Boston Red Sox
 Frank Lickliter, professional golfer.
 John Patterson MacLean, Universalist minister, archaeologist, and historian.
 William A. Newell, 18th Governor of New Jersey.
 James F. Schenck, U.S. Navy admiral and brother of Robert
 John N. C. Schenck, first post master of the Miami River Valley and early plotter of Warren County.
 Robert C. Schenck, U.S. Army general and brother of James
 William Cortenus Schenck, American army general in the War of 1812, pioneer surveyor of the Northwest Territory, and founder of Franklin; father of James and Robert
 Derik Steiner, professional football player.
 Shannon Stewart, fashion model and beauty pageant contestant.
 Wilbur P. Thirkield, president of Howard University.
 Bob Timberlake, professional football player.

References

Further reading
 Elva R. Adams. Warren County Revisited. [Lebanon, Ohio]: Warren County Historical Society, 1989.
 The Centennial Atlas of Warren County, Ohio. Lebanon, Ohio: The Centennial Atlas Association, 1903.
 Mabel Eldridge and Dudley Bryant. Franklin in the Great Miami Valley. Edited by Harriet E. Foley. Franklin, Ohio: , 1982.
 Harriet E. Foley, editor. Carlisle: The Jersey Settlement in Ohio, 1800–1990. 2nd ed. [Carlisle, Ohio?]: The Editor, 1990.
 Josiah Morrow. The History of Warren County, Ohio. Chicago: W.H. Beers, 1883. (Reprinted several times)
 Ohio Atlas & Gazetteer. 6th ed. Yarmouth, Maine: DeLorme, 2001. 
 William E. Smith. History of Southwestern Ohio: The Miami Valleys. New York: Lewis Historical Publishing, 1964. 3 vols.

External links
 City website
 Franklin City Schools
 

Cities in Warren County, Ohio
Populated places established in 1796
Cities in Ohio
1796 establishments in the Northwest Territory